Mount Ferguson, sometimes called Ferguson Mountain, is a mountain in the Municipality of Temagami, Northeastern Ontario, Canada. Mount Ferguson is situated near the boundary of geographic townships Cynthia and Aston.

The mountain is named after Peter A. Ferguson, a gold prospector from the town of Mattawa who staked mining claims on Mount Ferguson in the 1880s. He is also the namesake for Ferguson Bay, Ferguson Island and Ferguson Point. A fire lookout tower set up by the Department of Lands and Forests (now the Ministry of Natural Resources and Forestry) had formerly occupied the summit of Mount Ferguson. Dismantling of the fire tower took place in around 1975 after being abandoned since 1966.

Like the other highest peaks of this area, Mount Ferguson is underlain by Nipissing diabase.

See also
Devil Mountain

References

External links

Landforms of Temagami
Ferguson
Igneous intrusions
Igneous petrology of Ontario
Paleoproterozoic magmatism
Mountains of Canada under 1000 metres